Ossora Airport (Russian: Действует аэропорт) is a Public commercial airport located in an Ossora, Koryak Okrug of Kamchatka Krai, Russia.

Airlines and destinations

Passenger

See also
 List of airports in Russia
 Transport in Russia

References

Airports in Kamchatka Krai